Strange Weather, Isn't It? is the fourth album by dance-punk group !!!, released on August 24, 2010, on Warp Records. The album's first single, "AM/FM", was made available as a free download from the band's website and was released on limited edition clear vinyl on July 13, 2010.

Critical reception

Metacritic rates Strange Weather, Isn't It? as 67 out of 100, stating it has "generally favorable reviews" based on 26 critic scores.
Pitchfork (Larry Fitzmaurice) – "The album's more engaging moments stand out . . . but the general disparity of these few-and-far-between moments amidst the record's more driftless filler sadly cements the fate of Strange Weather, Isn't It?: you'll enjoy it plenty while it's on, but once it's over you might forget it ever existed."
musicOMH (Luke Winkie) – "It's practically a soundtrack for pool parties, clubs, and makeshift living room dance sessions. The album knows exactly what it wants to do, and accomplishes it with grace. You're not going to find nine songs that will keep your hips moving quite like these."
Slant Magazine (Kevin Liedel) – "If Strange Weather, Isn't It? achieves anything, it's blind, technical dedication to beat-centric music. Like a drum machine left on play and then abandoned by its programmer, the album is relentless in its speed to go nowhere, pounding and tapping and clicking with nothing more than artificial purpose. . . Simply put, Strange Weather, Isn't It? is beat for the sake of beat."

Track listing

Personnel
Nic Offer – vocals, keyboards, guitar
Justin Van Der Volgen – bass, guitar, effects
Mario Andreoni – guitar, bass
Tyler Pope – guitar, bass
Allan Wilson – keyboards, saxophone, percussion
Guy Licatta (tracks 1 to 5), Jerry Fuchs (track 9), Paul Quattrone (tracks 1, 3, 6 to 8) – drums
Clarice Jensen – cello
Jason Disu, Nick Roseboro – horns
Daniel Gorman – keyboards
Caito Sanchez – percussions
Nadia Sirota – viola
Caleb Burhausm, Yuki Numata – violin
Ifeoluwa Babalola (tracks: 5, 6, 8), Olivia Mori (track 1), Shannon Funchess (tracks 3 to 5, 8) – vocals

Charts

References

2010 albums
!!! albums
Warp (record label) albums